Stephanorrhina guttata, common name spotted flower beetle, is a species of beetles of the family Scarabaeidae, subfamily Cetoniinae and tribe Goliathini.

Description
It has a brilliant metallic green and red coloration, with white spots on the elytra.

Distribution
This species occurs in Cameroon and Nigeria.

Subspecies
Stephanorrhina guttata aschantica Schürhoff, 1942
Stephanorrhina guttata colini Schürhoff, 1942
Stephanorrhina guttata insularis Allard, 1989
Stephanorrhina guttata meridionalis Allard, 1991
Stephanorrhina guttata uelensis Allard, 1991

References
 Biolib

External links
 Flower-beetles
 Goliathus
 Natural Worlds

Cetoniinae
Beetles described in 1789